Jill Suzanne Wagner (born January 13, 1979) is an American actress and television personality. She was the on-field host for the ABC game show Wipeout from 2008 to 2014. Since then, Wagner has starred in several made-for-television films for the Hallmark Channel and Hallmark Movies & Mysteries.

Early life and education
Wagner was born in Winston-Salem, North Carolina. She was raised primarily by her father, David Wagner, a U.S. Marine, and her grandmother. She attended Ledford Senior High School in Wallburg, North Carolina. Wagner went to North Carolina State University graduating in 2001 with a bachelor's degree in business management. During her teens, she trained at Barbizon Modeling and Acting School in Raleigh.

Career
After college, Wagner moved to California to pursue a career in entertainment. In 2003, she was selected as a cast member on the MTV series Punk'd, participating in several sketches. The following year, Wagner was ranked #90 on the Maxim Hot 100 Women of 2004. She was featured in the July 2006 issue of American FHM magazine.

In 2006, she co-starred in the Spike TV television series Blade: The Series as Krista Starr. She was a co-host of Inside the Vault on WGN America. Wagner has also had guest roles on a variety of television series including Quintuplets and Bones. Her theatrical roles include Junebug (2005) and the horror film Splinter in 2008.

In March 2008, it was announced that Wagner would be the on-field host for the ABC game show Wipeout which premiered June 24, 2008. In April 2011, Wagner announced that she was leaving Wipeout after four seasons to focus on her acting career; she was succeeded by Vanessa Minnillo for the series' fifth season. In late August 2012, it was announced that Wagner would return as the co-host of Wipeout for its sixth season, a role she continued throughout the rest of the series' run.

In June 2011, Wagner appeared on the series Teen Wolf  airing on MTV. In 2013, Wagner appeared on Rhett and Link's third episode of their YouTube series The Mythical Show; this was in response to an episode of their talk show Good Mythical Morning, where they mentioned they had gone to college with a girl who had caught their interest, but never had the courage to talk to, who was revealed to be Wagner.

In 2015, Wagner was tapped to host the original series Handcrafted America on INSP; the series began its third season in August 2017. Wagner appeared in the Canadian film Braven (2018).

Since 2015, she has appeared in Hallmark Channel made-for-television films, including playing Amy Winslow on the Mystery 101 movie series on the Hallmark Movies & Mysteries Channel in 2019. Since December 2021, Wagner has appeared in Great American Family made-for-television films, including A Merry Christmas Wish which premiered in December 2022.

Personal life
In April 2017, Wagner married former pro hockey player David Lemanowicz, after they had announced their engagement earlier in 2016. In April 2020, Wagner gave birth to a daughter. A second daughter was born in August 2021.

Filmography

Film

Television

References

External links

 
 Playboy.com Interview (archive copy)
 Gateship-One Interview
 Interview at Talk Humor (archive copy)

1979 births
Actors from Winston-Salem, North Carolina
Actresses from North Carolina
American television actresses
American television personalities
American women television personalities
Living people
North Carolina State University alumni
21st-century American women